QUAD is a high-performance data compressor based on the LZ algorithms (LZ77, LZ78, LZW). It's designed to produce small files but still decompress fast and with little memory. QUAD is licensed under the LGPL.

External links 
 http://quad.sourceforge.net/

Archive formats
Free data compression software
Lossless compression algorithms